The Portuguese Asia Commerce Company (Portuguese: Companhia do Comércio da Asia Portuguesa) was a charter company created by Sebastião José de Carvalho e Melo, Marquis of Pombal, in 1753. It was made to promote mercantile activity between the Qing Dynasty and Portuguese India.

History 
The company was established after Feliciano Velho Oldemberg and five other merchants received permission to negotiate relations between India and China for a period of a decade. However, the Lisbon Earthquake of 1755 caused great damage to both the company's newly acquired ships and goods stocked in Lisbon. Subsequent scandals involving Feliciano's son and the Marquis and a failure to repay loans to the Portuguese monarchy led to the bankruptcy of both the company and Feliciano, its main shareholder in 1760.

References 

History of India
Colonial Indian companies
Portuguese Empire
Defunct companies of Portugal
Chartered companies
1753 establishments
Companies established in the 18th century